A normal school is an institution created to train high school graduates to be teachers by educating them in the norms of pedagogy and curriculum.

State Normal School may also refer to:
 State Normal School (Athens, Georgia)
 State Normal School at Cheney
 Chico State Normal School
 State Normal School of Colorado
 State Normal School for Colored Persons
 Connecticut State Normal School
 Duluth State Normal School
 Durham State Normal School
 Eastern Illinois State Normal School
 Eastern Kentucky State Normal School
 Edinboro State Normal School
 Iowa State Normal School
 State Normal School at Los Angeles
 Mansfield State Normal School
 State Normal School of Marshall College
 Massachusetts State Normal School
 Michigan State Normal School
 Northern Illinois State Normal School
 State Normal School of Pennsylvania
 San Francisco State Normal School
 St. Cloud State Normal School
 State Normal School at Valley City Historic District
 Washington State Normal School at Bellingham
 Washington State Normal School at Cheney Historic District
 Western Kentucky State Normal School
 State Normal School at Whatcom